Knapp is an unincorporated community in Wright County, Minnesota, United States.  The community is located along Wright County Road 35 (Division Street) near Quinnell Avenue SW.

Knapp is located within Cokato Township and French Lake Township.  Nearby places include Cokato, Kingston, Annandale, and Knapp Wildlife Management Area.

References

Unincorporated communities in Minnesota
Unincorporated communities in Wright County, Minnesota